Agrotis haifae is a moth of the family Noctuidae. It is found in the eremic zone from North Africa to the Arabian Peninsula.

Adults are on wing from October to April depending on the location. There is one generation per year.

References

External links 
 Noctuinae of Israel

Agrotis
Moths described in 1897
Moths of Africa
Moths of the Middle East